Azali is a 2018 Ghanaian drama film directed by Kwabena Gyansah. It was selected as the Ghanaian entry for the Best International Feature Film at the 92nd Academy Awards, but it was not nominated. It was the first time that Ghana had submitted a film for the Best International Feature Film Oscar.

Plot
A young girl, Amina, lives with her mother, grandmother, and uncle in a small village in northern Ghana. She lives a comfortable but boring life from which her mother wishes to free her. Her grandmother wishes for Amina to marry an older man from their village. Amina's mother protests and unknowingly sells Amina to strangers in the hopes of her finding a better life in the city. On her journey Amina meets young man who was also sold as a boy and, in some way, becomes her only friend. The two run away with a small band of kids who were also sold off. As the two embark on various errands through Accra they try to earn their keep.

The young man, Seidu, becomes popular as he is a quick and hard worker. Amina is clumsy and cannot keep up with the work given to her. She quickly finds herself living in a compound of a woman who demands rent daily. Here Amina learns that in order to stay she must always have money, however her job as a head-porter is not lucrative enough. She decides to join her neighbor, the landlord's favorite, as a prostitute in order to stay. For a while this goes well, but she grows sadder as the work goes on. Eventually she tries to reunite with Seidu. He turns her away because he cannot afford to be an outsider in his newly found living/working arrangements as a porter. Amina returns to the taxing compound and grows complacent as time passes. During this time Amina's Uncle, Akatok, goes to search for Amina in Accra after her mother finds out the news her daughter is “missing”.

For months Akatok searches but to no avail. He decides he will give up after just three months of searching, but is put back on track by an old friend with great advice. Amina, now more accustomed to her job, sleeps with a man who refuses to pay her the promised wage. She, in turn, breaks a glass over his head and steals the money from his wallet. Amina runs to find Seidu to tell him she wishes to go back home. Instead she find Seidu's boss who calls her in to wait on Seidu together. Seidu's boss attacks Amina while they are alone and rapes her. Seidu comes back to the terrible scene and apologizes for interrupting his boss. As he backs away he is visibly distraught by what he's just witnessed.

Seidu, later on, beats his boss for what he's done leaving him bleeding in the street. Amina returns to the demanding landlord and her neighbor who tries to care for her after the attack. Soon after Amina and the landlord learn of Amina's pregnancy for which the landlord berates her. Amina cannot have a baby in the compound, so she goes to live on the streets of Accra while just a few weeks pregnant.
Eight months pass and Amina has become a head-porter again, this time more graceful and heavier; she is in her last trimester of pregnancy. Akatok and his friend continue their search nearby. While working Amina encounters a mob of people who are trying to beat a man to death. They call this man an animal and pour gasoline over him. Once she comes closer Amina realizes that the bloodied and beaten man is Seidu. In disgust and horror she turns away as the match is being lit. She also notices Seidu's boss in the crowd watching over everything as dark smoke begins to rise behind him. At this moment Akatok and his long-time friend spot Amina in the crowd and go to her. Akatok is overjoyed but it is short-lived as he notices Seidu's boss. He points out the man to Amina as her father, Razak; Amina immediately faints on hearing the news.

Finally, back in her hometown Amina, and Akatok, find her mother and grandmother in their compound. They rejoice for her return but again Amina falters, clutching her stomach. She gives birth in her family's compound under the star-filled sky. In the final scenes we hear the baby crying and the grandmother chanting over the baby. We hear a man, presumably Akatok, speak in his native tongue. The words on screen as he speaks read: This child will never be accepted by tradition so in our hearts we buried a secret only heaven knows.

Cast
 Ama K. Abebrese as Joan
 Asana Alhassan as Amina
 Adjetey Anang as Akatok
 Akofa Edjeani Asiedu as Rukaya
 Emmanuel Nii Adom Quaye as Quartey
 Peter Ritchie as Boss

Awards
The film was nominated in 15 categories at the 2018 Ghana Movie Awards. It received 19 nominations at the 2019 Golden Movie Awards.

See also
 List of submissions to the 92nd Academy Awards for Best International Feature Film
 List of Ghanaian submissions for the Academy Award for Best International Feature Film

References

External links
 

2018 films
Dagbani-language films
Akan-language films
2018 drama films
Ghanaian drama films